The 1985–86 Yugoslav First League season was marked by scandal and controversy due to allegedly wide match-fixing during the last week of fixtures.

Summary
After the last week was played, FK Partizan was crowned champion due to better goal difference than second-placed Red Star Belgrade. However, after weeks of public pressure and huge public outcry, on 20 June 1986, the Yugoslav FA presidency headed by Slavko Šajber decided to impose extraordinary measures that included the following:
voiding the already played week 34 matches of the 1985–86 season and ordering a replay of every single one (nine fixtures in total)
docking 6 points from each of the 12 clubs suspected of being involved in match-fixing, meaning they would start the following league season with -6 points

Each club agreed to play the replay except for Partizan. As a result their week 34 fixture was registered as a 3–0 defeat, and the club was thus stripped of the league title, which was now awarded to Red Star. Based on this decision, it was Red Star Belgrade who got to represent SFR Yugoslavia in the 1986–87 European Cup.

What followed on domestic front was a series of appeals and lawsuits and the entire case eventually went all the way to the Yugoslav Constitutional Court. By the time Yugoslav Constitutional Court delivered its final ruling to the Court of Joint Labour of SR Serbia on 29 July 1987, the next league season was already completed with FK Vardar winning the title due to 12 teams starting the season with -6 points.

The court's ruling was that there was no evidence of wrongdoing in the week 34 of the 1985–86 season and thus that season's title was given back to Partizan. That also meant that there was no merit for the 6-point docking in the 1986–87 and now that season's table was re-counted so that now Partizan became a new champion.

Still, Vardar got to represent SFR Yugoslavia in the 1987–88 European Cup.

League table

Results

Winning squad

Match-fixing controversy
As mentioned, week 34, the last week of 1985–86 Yugoslav First League season, featured some highly suspicious results. All the matches started at the same time on Sunday, 15 June 1986.

† results of matches suspected being fixed

Top scorers

Attendance

Overall league attendance per match: 8,507 spectators

See also
1985–86 Yugoslav Second League
1985–86 Yugoslav Cup

References

External links
Yugoslavia Domestic Football Full Tables

Yugoslav First League seasons
Yugo
1985–86 in Yugoslav football